This article outlines notable events occurring in 2001 in spaceflight, including major launches and EVAs.

Launches 

|colspan=8|

January 
|-

|colspan=8|

February 
|-

|colspan=8|

March 
|-

|colspan=8|

April 
|-

|colspan=8|

May 
|-

|colspan=8|

June 
|-

|colspan=8|

July 
|-

|colspan=8|

August 
|-

|colspan=8|

September 
|-

|colspan=8|

October 
|-

|colspan=8|

November 
|-

|colspan=8|

December 
|-

|}

Deep space rendezvous

EVAs

Orbital launch summary

By country

References

Footnotes 

 
Spaceflight by year